Buses in Swindon have been the major method of public transport in the region since the beginning of the 20th century. Introduced in 1927 and replacing the tram system in 1929, the area is now served by numerous operators.

History
Swindon Corporation was the local council formed by the 1901 Municipal Borough charter, and Swindon Corporation Tramways started to operate electric trams in 1904. 

Motor-bus operation started in 1927 and two years later all the trams were replaced by this form of transport. In 1942 Swindon became one of the first authorities to take delivery of the "Arab" made by Guy Motors. One of these, No. 51 (DHR 192), is now preserved at RAF Wroughton near Swindon which is an Annex of the National Museum of Science and Industry and open to the public on certain days of the year.

On local government re-organisation in the early 1970s the name was changed to Thamesdown Transport. Following a sale to the Go-Ahead Group in February 2017, it was rebranded Swindon's Bus Company.

Rural and inter-urban bus services around Swindon were mainly operated by Bristol Tramways (later known as Bristol Omnibus Company), which established a branch in Swindon in 1921.  Bristol became part of the National Bus Company, and in 1983 the Swindon branch was transferred to a new company, Cheltenham & Gloucester Omnibus Company, operating in Swindon under the name Swindon and District.  Cheltenham & Gloucester was sold to its management in 1986, and absorbed into the Stagecoach Group as Stagecoach in Swindon in 1993.

Bus station and Fleming Way

Original bus station

Before 1966 Swindon had no bus station, and buses departed from street stops in and around Regent Circus. The first bus station was opened in 1966 on the site of the tram station in Corporation Street. Following expansion it eventually took up most of the land between Manchester Road and Fleming Way. The site was redeveloped in the 1980s on construction of the current facility, with the bus station replaced by office accommodation now used by Zurich Financial Services.

Existing bus station
The current bus station was constructed in the 1980s, adjacent to the former site of Thamesdown Transport's garages. It predominantly acts as a terminus for buses serving destinations outside of the Swindon urban area or non-frequent services. It is also used as a coach station, with services by National Express, Megabus and international services leaving from here. In recent years, following increased immigration from Eastern European countries, regular services to Poland have been introduced.

Redevelopment

In 2004, Swindon Borough Council announced the proposed redevelopment of the town centre area including the bus station. Thamesdown Transport moved from their Corporation Street home to a new facility at Barnfield in 2005, with the land earmarked for conversion to commercial properties. As well as town centre offices, the project also makes provision for housing, shops, cafes and restaurants. The plans would lead to the demolition of all buildings in this area, including the current bus station, with a replacement to be built along Fleming Way. In 2015, a multi-storey carpark adjacent to the bus station was demolished as part of this scheme. The former Stagecoach Bus Depot on Eastcott Road has been approved for development as a housing site.

Operators

Coachstyle
Coachstyle provides services to Royal Wootton Bassett, Malmesbury and Yate from the bus station.

AD Rains
AD Rains provides services to Royal Wootton Bassett, Ashton Keynes and Crudwell from the bus station, and also operate a service X70 from Swindon to Marlborough on college days.

APL Travel
APL Travel provide services to Lechlade and Fairford from the bus station.

Megabus
Megabus provide low-cost bus services to Cheltenham, Gloucester and London from a stop adjacent to the Sainsbury’s superstore at Stratton.

National Express
National Express provide nationwide coach travel from the bus station.

Stagecoach West
Stagecoach West operate in West and North Swindon and in rural areas. The company also provides a Sunday service on some Swindon's Bus Company routes. Two routes are branded as Stagecoach Gold services with higher specification buses: the S6 to Oxford via Shrivenham and Faringdon, and the 55 to Chippenham via Calne.

Swindon's Bus Company
Swindon's Bus Company operate the majority of Swindon's urban services and school buses. They also provide employee services for Nationwide, having 3 bus routes (the N1, the NW2 and the NW3), with all of the routes serving the headquarters of Nationwide. Services terminate at both the bus station and Fleming Way, although with Fleming Way now being shut, the bus services that used to terminate at Fleming Way now terminate at the Bus Station.

Salisbury Reds
Salisbury Reds operate the X5 service to Marlborough, Pewsey, Amesbury and Salisbury which runs hourly from the bus station.

Ticketing
The majority of tickets purchased on Swindon's Bus Company and Stagecoach West services are honoured by both operators.

See also
Transport in Swindon

Notes

External links
 Swindon Borough Council public transport homepage
 Swindon Park and Ride

Bus transport in England
Transport in Swindon